The Story of... (or The [insert celebrity] Story) is a series of documentary style programmes by Channel 5, charting the rise of some of Britain's best loved celebrities and pop culture moments. The show began broadcasting in May 2016.

List of Episodes 

British documentary television series